CAAA may refer to:

 Clean Air Act Amendments, a United States law to reduce air pollution
 Crane Army Ammunition Activity, a military facility in Crane, Indiana, United States.
 China Academy of Aerospace Aerodynamics, a research organization in Beijing, China.